Edmund John Skoronski (October 15, 1910 – December 22, 1996) was an American football end who played three seasons in the National Football League with the Pittsburgh Pirates, Cleveland Rams and Brooklyn Dodgers. He first enrolled at Georgetown University before transferring to Purdue University. He attended Brown High School in Chicago.

References

External links
Just Sports Stats

1910 births
1996 deaths
Players of American football from Chicago
American football ends
Georgetown Hoyas football players
Purdue Boilermakers football players
Pittsburgh Pirates (football) players
Cleveland Rams players
Brooklyn Dodgers (NFL) players